Millbrook is a village in Dutchess County, New York, United States. Millbrook is near the center of the town of Washington, of which it is a part. As of the 2020 census, Millbrook's population was 1,455. It is often referred to as a low-key version of the Hamptons, and is one of the most affluent villages in New York.

Millbrook is part of the Poughkeepsie–Newburgh–Middletown Metropolitan Statistical Area as well as the larger New York–Newark–Bridgeport Combined Statistical Area.

Geography

Demographics

As of the census of 2000, there were 1,429 people, 678 households, and 361 families residing in the village. The population density was 764.3 people per square mile (295.0/km2). There were 744 housing units at an average density of 397.90 per square mile (153.6/km2). The racial makeup of the village was 95.90% white, 2.70% African American, 0.20% Asian, 0.30% from other races, and 1.00% from two or more races. Hispanic or Latino of any race were 3.00% of the population.

There were 678 households, out of which 23.7% had children under the age of 18 living with them, 42.6% were married couples living together, 8.3% had a female householder with no husband present, and 46.8% were non-families. 40.9% of all households were made up of individuals, and 19.0% had someone living alone who was 65 years of age or older. The average household size was 2.10 and the average family size was 2.88.

In the village, the population was spread out, with 21.0% under the age of 18, 5.9% from 18 to 24, 25.3% from 25 to 44, 26.7% from 45 to 64, and 21.1% who were 65 years of age or older. The median age was 44 years. For every 100 females, there were 85.1 males. For every 100 females age 18 and over, there were 82.4 males.

The median income for a household in the village was $68,552, and the median income for a family was $96,473. Males had a median income of $67,917 versus $57,400 for females. The per capita income for the village was $49,114. About 1.0% of families and 5.7% of the population were below the poverty line, including 4.4% of those under age 18 and 1.9% of those age 65 or over.

History
The site of present-day Millbrook was originally part of a much larger land grant given in 1697. In the years before the American Revolution, two nearby settlements - Mechanic and Hart's Village - were established within the confines of the modern Millbrook.

In 1869, the Dutchess and Columbia Railroad commenced operating with a stop called Millbrook, named after an adjacent farm. This new rail stop lay between Mechanic and Hart's Village and the economic opportunities it afforded soon led to a developing village centered on the Millbrook stop. However, it was not until 1895 that Millbrook was incorporated as a village.

Millbrook is the site of the Hitchcock Estate, which Timothy Leary made a nexus of the psychedelic movement in the 1960s and where he conducted research and wrote The Psychedelic Experience.

Schools and colleges

 Dutchess Day School 
 Millbrook Central School District
 Millbrook High School, New York 
 Millbrook School 
 Upton Lake Christian Academy
 Cardinal Hayes School
 Millbrook Community Preschool at Grace Church

Millbrook was also the location of the campus of the former Bennett College, which closed in 1978.

The Roman Catholic Archdiocese of New York operates Catholic schools in Dutchess County. St. Joseph's School in Millbrook closed in 2013.

Points of interest 
 Mary Flagler Cary Arboretum
 Innisfree Garden
 Nine Partners Meeting House
 Wing Castle
Rocky Reef Trebuchet (Stanfordville)
Millbrook Winery and Vineyard
Wethersfield House and Gardens
Mashomack Preserve Club polo fields
Orvis Sandanona 
 Cary Institute of Ecosystem Studies
Trevor Zoo at Millbrook School
Bennett College (ruins)
 Millbrook Golf and Tennis Club
 Tamarack Preserve Ltd

Transportation
Millbrook is served by Dutchess County Public Transit's route "D" bus.

Notable people
Gerardo Colacicco, pastor and auxiliary bishop
Hamilton Fish IV, (1926–1996) congressman who resided in Millbrook while serving in office
Nick Fish (1958–2020), attorney and member of the Portland City Commission
James Gorman, CEO Morgan Stanley
Mindy Grossman, CEO of Weight Watchers
John Wesley Hanes II, (1892–1987) investment banker and corporate turnaround specialist who served as undersecretary of the United States Treasury
Timothy Leary, Harvard psychologist involved in the "psychedelic movement"
Bette Midler, singer, songwriter, actress, comedian, philanthropist
Richard Migliore, 2005 Jockey of the Year; retired in 2010
Mary Tyler Moore, (1936–2017) actress
Ric Ocasek, (1944–2019), former lead singer the Cars
Paulina Porizkova, supermodel
Franklin Delano Roosevelt Jr., congressman
Walter C. Teagle, (1878–1962) president of Standard Oil
Oakleigh Thorne, (July 31, 1866 − May 23, 1948), businessman, publisher, banker, and philanthropist
Doug Tompkins, (March 20, 1943 – December 8, 2015), co-founder of North Face and Esprit
Robert Trump, real estate developer and philanthropist; younger brother of Donald Trump

References

External links

 Millbrook information
 city-data.com entry
 Millbrook Free Library
The Millbrook Independent

Villages in New York (state)
Poughkeepsie–Newburgh–Middletown metropolitan area
Villages in Dutchess County, New York